Papaver setigerum, common name poppy of Troy or dwarf breadseed poppy, is a herbaceous annual plant of the family Papaveraceae.

This plant is closely related to and sometimes treated as a subspecies of opium poppy (Papaver somniferum). In fact it produces a very small amount of morphine alkaloids. However, P. somniferum is diploid (n=11) and P. setigerum is tetraploid (n=22) with  twice the number of chromosomes. So it cannot be considered the  wild ancestral species of the opium poppy.

Etymology
The genus name is derived from the Latin word papaverum meaning “poppy”, while the specific name setigerum derives the Latin "saetiger" meaning “bristly” for the short bristle on the top of the lobes of its leaves.

Description
Papaver setigerum reaches on average  in height. The stem is erect and the leaves are simple, oblong, the lower ones are sessile, deeply lobed and toothed, the higher ones shortly pedunculated.

The flowers at the apex of the stem are hermaphroditic, actinomorphic ("star shaped", "radial"), 4 to 10 cm in diameter. The corolla forms a cup with four pink-purple petals, with a dark purple blotch at the base. It has several stamens with dark filaments holding yellow anthers. Flowering occurs from May through June in the northern hemisphere. The fruits are glabrous capsules 2 to 3 cm long, dehiscent along the holes located under the apical disc. The kidney-shaped seeds are about 1 mm wide.

Distribution
This plant grows wild in the Mediterranean region, especially in southwestern Europe (Portugal, Spain, France, Italy, Greece) and in North Africa. It occurs in south-eastern Australia as a garden escapee.

Habitat

Gallery

References

 Tutin, T.G. et al. - Flora Europaea, second edition - 1993

External links

 Biolib

setigerum
Invasive plant species in Japan